Speak is the first major studio album from the contemporary Christian music musician, Jimmy Needham. It was released on August 15, 2006 under Inpop Records in the United States.

Hamilton Loomis appeared as a guest on the album, playing guitar, bass and harmonica.

Track listing
"I Am New" – 3:15
"Lost at Sea" – 4:00
"Fence Riders" – 3:30
"Dearly Loved" – 4:18
"For Freedom" – 4:10
"Speak" – 3:43
"You Make Me Sing" – 3:32
"Wake Up" – 3:28
"Regardless" – 3:26
"Stand on Grace" – 4:11
"The Gospel" – 3:43
"The Benediction" – 1:36

Singles
"Dearly Loved"
"Lost at Sea"
"Fence Riders"

References

2006 albums
Jimmy Needham albums
Inpop Records albums